"I Dreamt I Dwelt in Marble Halls", or "The Gipsy Girl's Dream", is a popular aria from The Bohemian Girl, an 1843 opera by Michael William Balfe, with lyrics by Alfred Bunn. It is sung in the opera by the character Arline, who is in love with Thaddeus, a Polish nobleman and political exile.

In popular culture

In addition to its regular performance in the opera, and in cast recordings of the opera, the aria, which was very popular in the 19th and 20th centuries, has been recorded many times by a variety of musicians as a stand-alone song. It has also been parodied.

 Lewis Carroll's parody of the lyrics was published in Lays of Mystery, Imagination and Humour in 1855: 
 The song was recorded several times during the mid-twentieth century by Dame Joan Sutherland.
 The opera is mentioned, and the aria referred to several times, in the 1944 novel Dragonwyck, by Anya Seton, which is set in 1844. The song makes a brief appearance in the 1946 film adaptation of the book.
 The opera is featured in two short stories published in James Joyce’s 1914 work Dubliners: "Clay" and "Eveline".
An ambient, ethereal version was recorded by The Irish singer Enya for her Grammy-winning 1991 album, Shepherd Moons: this version was featured on the soundtrack of the 1993 Martin Scorsese film The Age of Innocence.
 Sinéad O'Connor recorded a version of the song for the soundtrack of the 1997 Irish film The Butcher Boy.
 The song is also sung by the character Arline (played by the actress Julie Bishop) in the 1936 movie The Bohemian Girl, starring Stan Laurel and Oliver Hardy.
 The aria is played and sung by the character Clementina Cavendish (Florence Hoath) in the 1998 film The Governess.
 Cellist Julian Lloyd Webber has recorded the song on two occasions: with singer Aled Jones on Jones' 2003 album Higher; and with harpist Catrin Finch on Lloyd Webber's 2006 album Unexpected Songs.
 Norwegian soprano Sissel Kyrkjebø featured a version on her 2006 album Into Paradise.
 Australian harpist Siobhan Owen recorded the song in her album Lilium.
 The protagonist in Sarah Perry's novel Melmoth (2018) sings the song to a burn victim in a hospital in Manila and is later haunted by someone (unknown and unseen) singing it in Prague.

References

External links

 1909 recording by Elizabeth Wheeler

Compositions by Michael William Balfe
Opera excerpts
English songs
1843 songs
Soprano arias